The European Union Training Mission Somalia (EUTM Somalia) is a training operation for the Somali Armed Forces conducted by military officials from European Union states.

Operations

On 10 April 2010, the European Union launched a military training mission in Somalia (EUTM Somalia), with a mandate to support the Transitional Federal Government (TFG) and assist in strengthening national institutions.

EUTM Somalia was originally centered on training activities. Due to the political and security situation in Somalia at the time, the mission initially conducted training abroad in Uganda. Its headquarters were temporarily based in Kampala, and training was held at a military camp in Bihanga. On 22 January 2013, the Council of the European Union extended EUTM Somalia's mandate for a third time to March 2015, in the process adding strategic advisory and mentoring activities to the mission's areas of focus.

Since its establishment, EUTM Somalia officials have trained around 3,600 Somali army personnel. In the first few months of 2014, the mission permanently transferred all of its advisory, mentoring and training activities to Somalia, where it now operates a Mentoring Advisory and Training Element (MATE HQ) in Mogadishu.

In February 2014, EUTM Somalia began its first "Train the Trainers" programme at the Jazeera Training Camp in Mogadishu. 60 Somali National Army soldiers that had been previously trained by EUTM would take part in a four-week refresher course on infantry techniques and procedures, including international humanitarian law and military ethics. The training would be conducted by 16 EU trainers. Following the course's completion, the Somali soldiers would be qualified as instructors to then train SNA recruits, with mentoring provided by EUTM Somalia personnel.
A team of EUTM Somalia advisors also started offering strategic advice to the Somali Ministry of Defence and General Staff. Additionally, capacity building, advice and specific mentoring with regard to security sector development and training are envisioned for 2014.

Mission
EUTM Somalia is partnered with the Somali authorities to a build a professional national military that is accountable to the Somali government. Its activities take place within the framework of the European Union's overall presence in Somalia, including political, security and civic engagement.

Commanders
As of March 2015, EUTM Somalia was commanded by Brigadier General Antonio Maggi (Italy). He succeeded Brigadier General Massimo Mingiardi (Italy), Brigadier General Gerald Aherne (Ireland), Colonel Michael Beary (Ireland), and Colonel Ricardo Gonzalez Elul (Spain).

Funding
Between February 2013-March 2015, common funding for EUTM Somalia totals €11.6 million.

Partnerships
EUTM Somalia works in close cooperation and coordination with other international parties and stakeholders. Among these are the United Nations, the United States Department of State, and the African Union Mission in Somalia (AMISOM).

Additionally, EUTM Somalia has a Support Cell in Brussels and a Liaison Office in Nairobi.

See also
Operation Atalanta

References

 Nilsson, Claes, Norberg, Johan, European Union Training Mission Somalia: A Mission Assessment, 2014.

External links
European Union Training Mission Somalia

Somalia
Military operations involving Portugal